The Age of Backwards E.P. was the first release by the short-lived band The Spells, a collaboration between Carrie Brownstein and Mary Timony.

The group also recorded a second E.P. entitled "Bat vs. Bird" in 2008, which also contained 4 songs and totaled about 9 minutes. "Bat vs. Bird," with its more prominent percussion (as opposed to the subdued backbeats of "The Age of Backwards") and overall "full band" sound, was more of a promise of what was to come from Wild Flag, which is composed of Mary Timony, Carrie Brownstein, Janet Weiss, and Rebecca Cole.

Track listing
 "The Age of Backwards"
 "Octaves Apart"
 "Number One Fan"
 "Can't Explain [The Who]"

References

1999 EPs